Kumal is a caste or ethnic group in Nepal, traditionally associated with pottery. Their traditional profession is endangered due to competition from cheaper, more durable industrial pots. Fewer youths learn the skills.

Kumal people speak the Kumal language; their traditional dance, the Pangdure, is considered endangered. According to the population census of 2011, 121,000 Kumals live in Nepal; there are 12,000 native speakers of the Kumal language.

References

Further reading

External links

Indigenous peoples of Nepal